Budaklar can refer to:

 Budaklar, Ayvacık
 Budaklar, Çat